Iulia Hasdeu National College may refer to one of two educational institutions in Romania:

Iulia Hasdeu National College (Bucharest)
Iulia Hasdeu National College (Lugoj)